Baek Seung-Min (born March 12, 1986) is a South Korean football player.

Baek has played for the South Korea national football team in the 2003 FIFA U-17 World Championship and 2005 FIFA World Youth Championship.

He was permanently released from domestic football league system for his involvement in a match-fixing scandal during 2010 season.

Club career statistics

References

External links

1983 births
Living people
Association football midfielders
South Korean footballers
Jeonnam Dragons players
K League 1 players
Footballers from Seoul
Yonsei University alumni